De Carlo is a surname derived from the personal name Karl / Carl. Notable people with the surname include:

Andrea De Carlo (born 1952), Italian writer
Antonio De Carlo (born 1967), Mexican actor 
Giancarlo De Carlo (1919–2005), Italian architect
Lapo De Carlo (born 1968), Italian sports journalist and presenter
Luca De Carlo (born 1972), Italian politician
Massimo De Carlo (1919–2005), Italian art dealer
Yvonne De Carlo (1922–2007), Canadian actress

See also

De Carle
de Carli
DeCarlo
Di Carlo
John Del Carlo
Sergio De Karlo

Notes

Italian-language surnames
Surnames of Italian origin
Patronymic surnames
Surnames from given names